Samir al-Rifai (30 January 1901 – 12 October 1965) was Jordanian politician. He served several terms as the 8th Prime Minister of Jordan. He was born in Safed.

Al-Rifai served under Kings Abdullah I, Talal and Hussein:
Minister of Finance from 1943 to 1944
Prime Minister of the Emirate of Transjordan from 15 October 1944 to 19 May 1945
Prime Minister of the Emirate of Transjordan from 19 May 1945 to 25 May 1946
Prime Minister of the Hashemite Kingdom of Jordan from 4 December 1950 to 25 July 1951
Prime Minister of the Hashemite Kingdom of Jordan from 8 January 1956 to 22 May 1956
Prime Minister of the Hashemite Kingdom of Jordan from 18 May 1958 to 6 May 1959
Prime Minister of the Hashemite Kingdom of Jordan from 27 March 1963 to 21 April 1963
President of the Senate of Jordan from 10 July 1963 to 1 November 1965
He was the father of Prime Minister Zaid al-Rifai and the grandfather of Prime Minister Samir Rifai.

He died in Amman, aged 64.

See also 
 List of prime ministers of Jordan

References

External links
 Prime Ministry of Jordan website

1901 births
1965 deaths
People from Safed
Prime Ministers of Jordan
Jordanian people of Palestinian descent
Government ministers of Jordan
Education ministers of Jordan
Interior ministers of Jordan
Finance ministers of Jordan
Economy ministers of Jordan
Justice ministers of Jordan
Foreign ministers of Jordan
Defence ministers of Jordan
Deputy prime ministers of Jordan
American University of Beirut alumni
Members of the Senate of Jordan
Presidents of the Senate of Jordan
20th-century economists